The Amsterdamse Voetbalvereniging Zeeburgia is a football club from Amsterdam, Netherlands. It has been dubbed "royal supplier" as many Dutch professional footballers started at Zeeburgia youth teams. In 2020–2021, the first squad plays in the Tweede Klasse.

History
Zeeburgia was founded on 28 June 1919. 

On 26 August 1956 if lost 1–6 to Ajax Amsterdam in the first round of the 1956-57 National Dutch Cup.

From 1980 through 1984 the male first squad played in the Hoofdklasse.

Former players 
Listed are Zeeburgia players who turned professional.

References

External links
Official website
A.V.V. Zeeburgia toch naar Zeeburgereiland

Football clubs in the Netherlands
Football clubs in Amsterdam
Association football clubs established in 1919
1919 establishments in the Netherlands